Wiltshire Rocks is a group of rocks in the sea about  east-northeast of Smith Rocks,  east of Kitney Island, and  northwest of Paterson Islands, off the coast of Mac. Robertson Land. First mapped from air photographs by the Lars Christensen Expedition, 1936–37, and named Spjotoyskjera. Renamed (1971) by Antarctic Names Committee of Australia (ANCA) for A.C.W. Wiltshire, cook at Mawson Station in 1963.

References

Rock formations of Mac. Robertson Land